The Model 1860 Light Cavalry Saber (also known as the M1862 as this was when the first 800 were issued) is a long sword made of steel and brass, used by US cavalry from the American Civil War until the end of the Indian wars; some were still in use during the Spanish–American War.

Before the Civil War there was no light or heavy cavalry in the US army. Instead there were "Dragoons" (founded 1830) and "Mounted Riflemen" (founded c.1840). In 1861 these mounted regiments were renamed cavalry and given yellow piping.

The M1860 saber received its name to distinguish it from the larger and heavier Model 1840 Heavy Cavalry Saber that it replaced. Like its predecessor it had a brass guard, leather-wrapped grip and steel scabbard but unlike the M1840 it was smaller and easier to handle.

By the end of the Civil War over 300,000 1860 sabers had been produced: 200,000 by Ames, 32,000 by Roby and many more by firms such as Tiffany and Co, Glaze, Justice, and Emerson and Silver. M1860s were carried not only by cavalry but also by many infantry and staff officers as the regulation Model 1850 Army Staff & Field Officers' Sword had to be privately purchased. High-ranking officers, like their European counterparts, often had their swords ornately engraved with gilding and foliage.  Famous users included George Armstrong Custer and J.E.B. Stuart.

Later in the Civil War large cavalry charges became less common and the cavalry took on the role of skirmishers. Many replaced their sabers with extra revolvers, or left it in the saddle while fighting on foot with their repeating Henry rifles and Spencer carbines.

This is the sword the cavalry use in Westerns, many being original antiques purchased by the movie industry in the 1920s when surplus Civil War equipment was cheap.

This model is currently used in some U.S. Army Cavalry units in Color Guards, or when in period type uniforms. Most are given as PCS (Permanent Change of Station) or ETS (Expiration of Term of Service) gifts to a departing Cavalry Trooper. Usually engraved on the scabbard with his name, rank and dates of service. Some are also worn, in full Dress Blues, (when earned on a "Spur Ride" or combat tour) with Stetson and Spurs.

Notes

References

 
 
 
 
 
 
 
 
 
 
 

Swords of the United States
American Civil War weapons
American frontier
Sabres